Chen Longhai  (born ) is a Chinese male volleyball player. He was part of the China men's national volleyball team at the 2014 FIVB Volleyball Men's World Championship in Poland. Currently, He plays for JTEKT Stings in Japanese league, V.League division 1.

Clubs
 Shanghai Golden Age (2009–2021)
 JTEKT Stings (2021–present)

References

1991 births
Living people
Chinese men's volleyball players
Place of birth missing (living people)
21st-century Chinese people